Noragyugh or Tazabine is a village de facto in the Askeran Province of the breakaway Republic of Artsakh, de jure in the Khojaly District of Azerbaijan, in the disputed region of Nagorno-Karabakh. The village has an ethnic Armenian-majority population, and also had an Armenian majority in 1989.

History 
The modern village was founded in 1966 by settlers from the nearby village of Hin Noragyugh, which was founded in the early 1800s.

During the Soviet period, the village was a part of the Askeran District of the Nagorno-Karabakh Autonomous Oblast.

Historical heritage sites 
Historical heritage sites in and around the village include a 12th/13th-century khachkar, the shrine of Sare Khach from between the 12th and 20th centuries, St. George's Church built in 1810, a 19th/20th-century cemetery, and a 19th-century spring monument.

Economy and culture 
The population is mainly engaged in agriculture and animal husbandry. As of 2015, the village has a municipal building, a house of culture, a secondary school, a music school, five shops and a medical centre. The Noragyugh branch of the Askeran Children's Music School is also located in the village.

Demographics 
The village had 1,396 inhabitants in 2005, and 1,517 inhabitants in 2015.

Gallery

References

External links 

 

Populated places in Askeran Province
Populated places in Khojaly District